Lee Jong-won (born September 25, 1969) is a South Korean actor.

Filmography

Television series 
 Love Is Blue (SBS, 1994)
 The Last Match (MBC, 1994)
 Partner (MBC, 1994)
 Our Sunny Days of Youth (KBS2, 1995)
 The Scent of Apple Blossoms (MBC, 1996)
 Icing (MBC, 1996)
 Women (SBS, 1997)
 Yesterday (MBC, 1997)
 Barefooted Youth (KBS2, 1998)
 Heart of Lies (MBC, 1998)
 Hong Gil-dong (SBS, 1998)
 Trap of Youth (SBS, 1999)
 Woman On Top (SBS, 1999)
 Tough Guy's Love (KBS2, 2000)
 SWAT Police (SBS, 2000)
 Law Firm (SBS, 2001)
 Pure Heart (KBS2, 2001)
 Like Father, Unlike Son (KBS2, 2001)
 Terms of Endearment (KBS2, 2004)
 Choice (SBS, 2004)
 Sad Love Story (MBC, 2005)
 A Farewell to Sorrow (KBS2, 2005)
 One Day Suddenly (SBS, 2006)
 My Husband's Woman (SBS, 2007)
 The Golden Age of Daughters-in-Law (KBS2, 2007)
 Fly High (SBS, 2007)
 I Am Happy (SBS, 2008)
 East of Eden (MBC, 2008)
 All About My Family (MBC, 2008)
 The Kingdom of the Winds (KBS2, 2008)
 General Hospital 2 (MBC, 2008)
 Jolly Widows (KBS1, 2009)
 Hometown of Legends "Myo-jeong's Pearl" (KBS2, 2009)
 Kim Su-ro, The Iron King (MBC, 2010)
 Gloria (MBC, 2010)
 The King of Legend (KBS1, 2010)
 Lights and Shadows (MBC, 2011)
 Goddess of Fire (MBC, 2013)
 Master's Sun (SBS, 2013)
 The Eldest (jTBC, 2013)
 Tears of Heaven (MBN, 2014)
 4 Legendary Witches (MBC, 2014)
 The Great Wives (MBC, 2015)
 The Promise (KBS2, 2016)
 School 2017 (KBS, 2017)
 Hide and Seek (MBC, 2018)
 Young Lady and Gentleman (KBS2 , 2021)
 Woman in a Veil (2023)

Films 
 Unfinished Song, My Love (1987)
 Teenage Coup (1991)
 Green Sleeves (1991)
 Couple By Contract (1994)
 Ardor (2002)
 Mr. Butterfly (2003)
 Come Tomorrow (2003)
 Flying Boys (2004)

Awards and nominations

References

External links 
 Lee Jongwon at Jellyfish Entertainment
 
 

Jellyfish Entertainment artists
1969 births
Living people
South Korean male film actors
South Korean male television actors
South Korean male models
People from Naju
Dankook University alumni